Nicolás Suazo Velásquez (born 9 January 1965 in San Pedro Sula, Cortés) is a retired Honduran footballer who played as a forward.

Club career
Nicknamed Nicogol because of his prolific goalscoring, Suazo played in Honduras for Independiente, Marathón and Victoria, in Costa Rica for Herediano alongside compatriot Danilo Galindo and for Comunicaciones and USAC in Guatemala.

He scored 48 goals in total in the Honduran National League and still is the most prolific Honduran in de Costa Rican league with 46.

International career
Suazo made his debut for Honduras in a May 1991 UNCAF Nations Cup match against Panama and has earned a total of 51 caps, scoring 28 goals. He has represented his country in 15 FIFA World Cup qualification matches and played at the 1991, 1993, and 1995 UNCAF Nations Cups as well as at the 1993 CONCACAF Gold Cup. He was top goalscorer at the 1993 UNCAF Cup with 5 goals.

His final international was a November 1998 friendly match against El Salvador.

International goals

Managerial career
After his playing career ended, he has been rather successful as a coach. He won 1 championships in Honduras with C.D. Marathón.

Personal life
His parents are Nicolás Suazo and Josefina Velásquez and he is the brother of footballer David Suazo. He is also Maynor Suazo cousin.

Honours

Player
C.D. Marathón
Honduran Cup: (1): 1994
C.S.D. Comunicaciones
Liga Nacional de Fútbol de Guatemala (1): 1997–98
Honduras
Copa Centroamericana (2): 1993, 1995

Manager
C.D. Marathón
Liga Nacional de Fútbol de Honduras: (1): 2004–05 A

References

External links

El ex florense Nicolás Suazo habla con LA PRENSA LIBRE (Interview) - Prensa Libre 
Acciones de jugadores hondureños - Nación 

1965 births
Living people
People from San Pedro Sula
Association football forwards
Honduran footballers
Honduras international footballers
1993 CONCACAF Gold Cup players
C.D. Marathón players
C.S. Herediano footballers
Comunicaciones F.C. players
Universidad de San Carlos players
C.D. Victoria players
Honduran expatriate footballers
Honduran expatriate sportspeople in Guatemala
Expatriate footballers in Guatemala
Expatriate footballers in Costa Rica
Liga Nacional de Fútbol Profesional de Honduras players
C.D. Marathón managers
Copa Centroamericana-winning players
Honduran football managers